Gernika is a railway station in Gernika, Basque Country, Spain. It is owned by Euskal Trenbide Sarea and operated by Euskotren. It lies on the Urdaibai line.

History 
The station opened as the northern terminus of the -Gernika line on 13 August 1888. The station was destroyed during the civil war when the town was bombed, and had to be rebuilt. In 1973, together with the electrification of the line, the tracks on the station and the depot were reformed. The station building was overhauled in 1990.

Services 
The station is served by Euskotren Trena line E4. It runs every 30 minutes (in each direction) during weekdays, and every hour during weekends.

References

External links
 

Euskotren Trena stations
Railway stations in Biscay
Railway stations in Spain opened in 1888